Posteo is an email service provider based in Berlin, Germany, offering paid email accounts for individuals and businesses. The service gained prominence during the aftermath of the post-2013 global surveillance disclosures, especially for its high standard security features and relative anonymity as it does not require any private information in the registration process.

Posteo offers support for DNSSEC/DANE and PGP (through Mailvelope in the web interface, which is running Roundcube). Additionally they offer two-factor-authentication via TOTP and use Extended Validation certificates and HPKP for the HTTPS connection.

In 2020, Posteo had approximately 425,000 active mail accounts.

See also 

 Comparison of webmail providers

References

External links
 

Companies based in Berlin
Internet properties established in 2009
Technology companies established in 2009
Webmail
German companies established in 2009